Midway is an unincorporated community in Georgetown Township, Vermilion County, Illinois, United States.

References

Unincorporated communities in Vermilion County, Illinois
Unincorporated communities in Illinois